In probability theory, a zero–one law is a result that states that an event must have probability 0 or 1 and no intermediate value. Sometimes, the statement is that the limit of certain probabilities must be 0 or 1.

It may refer to: 
 Borel–Cantelli lemma
 Blumenthal's zero–one law for Markov processes,
 Engelbert–Schmidt zero–one law for continuous, nondecreasing additive functionals of Brownian motion,
 Hewitt–Savage zero–one law for exchangeable sequences,
 Kolmogorov's zero–one law for the tail σ-algebra,
 Lévy's zero–one law, related to martingale convergence.
 Topological zero–one law, related to meager sets,
 
 Zero-one law (logic) for sentences valid in finite structures.

Probability theory